The chief minister of Lumbini Province is the chief executive of the Nepal state of Lumbini Province. In accordance with the Constitution of Nepal, the governor is a state's de jure head, but de facto executive authority rests with the chief minister. Following elections to the Provincial Assembly of Lumbini Province, the state's governor usually invites the party (or coalition) with a majority of seats to form the government. The governor appoints the chief minister, whose council of ministers are collectively responsible to the assembly. Given the confidence of the assembly, the chief minister's term is for five years and is subject to no term limits.

Since 2018, two people have been Chief Minister of Gandaki Province. Shankar Pokharel from CPN (Unified Marxist–Leninist) was appointed as first Chief Minister of Lumbini Province from  15 February 2018 to 2 May 2021 and 2 May 2021 to 11 August 2021. After securing majority in Provincial Assembly of Lumbini Province, Kul Prasad KC of the CPN (Maoist Center) assumed office on 11 August 2021.

List

See also 
Chief Minister of Province No. 1
Chief Minister of Madhesh Province
Chief Minister of Bagmati Province
Chief Minister of Gandaki Province
Chief Minister of Karnali Province
Chief Minister of Sudurpashchim Province

References

External links 
Governors
 
Heads of government

 Website of the Office of the Chief Minister